Segrate is a railway station in Italy. Located on the Milan–Venice railway, it serves the town of Segrate.

Services
Segrate is served by lines S5 and S6 of the Milan suburban railway network, operated by the Lombard railway company Trenord.

See also
 Milan suburban railway network

References

External links

Railway stations in Lombardy
Milan S Lines stations
Railway stations opened in 2002
2002 establishments in Italy
Buildings and structures in Segrate
Railway stations in Italy opened in the 21st century